Shooting was contested at the 2019 Summer Universiade from 4 to 9 July 2019 at the Mostra d’Oltremare Padiglione 3 in Naples.

Medal summary

Men's events

Women's events

Mixed events

Medal table

References

External links
2019 Summer Universiade – Shooting
Results book – Shooting (Archived version)

 
Universiade
2019 Summer Universiade events
Shooting at the Summer Universiade